Jeffrey Harris Lichtman (born June 5, 1965) is a New York-based criminal defense lawyer.

Early life and education 
Jeffrey Lichtman was born on June 5, 1965, in Newark, New Jersey, United States. He grew up in Clark, New Jersey. He attended Emory University for his bachelor's and graduated in 1987. He then went to Duke University School of Law and graduated in 1990. He opened his own law firm in 1999.

Career 
Lichtman's law offices are located in midtown Manhattan. He represented John Gotti Jr., and secured a dismissal of three charges of murder conspiracy, an acquittal on a $25 million securities fraud charge, and a hung jury on every remaining count brought against him. Some of his other clients include rappers The Game (who had his case dismissed) and Fat Joe.

In 2010, Lichtman's client—who was convicted of multiple counts of sexual assault—had his 27-year sentence vacated, and was released after Lichtman successfully argued that trial counsel was ineffective.

In 2011, Lichtman achieved an acquittal after trial for WPIX television reporter Vince DeMentri, on assault charges.

From 2011 to 2013, Lichtman hosted a radio talk show on AM 970 The Answer during the drive time.

In 2018, Lichtman represented Khari Noerdlinger, son of former New York City Hall aide Rachel Noerdlinger, on charges including manslaughter. After discovering that evidence was withheld which exonerated his client, the charges were dropped.

In 2018, he was hired by suspected Mexican drug lord Joaquín "El Chapo" Guzmán to represent him in his federal trial in Brooklyn, which lasted from November 2018 to February 2019. Guzmán was found guilty of all 10 counts in February 2019.

In 2022, Lichtman was hired as counsel in Bronx rapper Kay Flock's murder case.

Known Jeffrey Lichtman's clients
 John Gotti Jr., American mobster, former acting boss of Gambino Crime Family and son of John Gotti
 The Game, American West Coast rapper 
 Fat Joe, American East Coast rapper 
 Vince DeMentri, American broadcast journalist
 Joaquín "El Chapo" Guzmán, Mexican drug lord and one of the founders of the Sinaloa Cartel (México's most powerful drug cartel)
 Kay Flock, American drill rapper
 Sarma Melngailis, American chef, cookbook author, businesswoman and convicted  criminal

See also 
 United States of America v. Joaquín Guzmán Loera

References

External links
 

1965 births
American talk radio hosts
Duke University School of Law alumni
Emory University alumni
Living people
New York (state) lawyers
People from Clark, New Jersey
Lawyers from Newark, New Jersey